Zhangshu is a town under the administration of Xiangyin County, in northeastern Hunan, China. , it has one residential community and seven villages under its administration.

References 

Towns of Hunan
Xiangyin County